Dwayne Eddie McClain (born February 7, 1963) is an American former professional basketball player who was selected by the Indiana Pacers in the second round (27th pick overall) of the 1985 NBA draft.

He played in the NBA for one season and was drafted from Villanova University. As a member of the Pacers during the 1985–86 season, he averaged 3.5 points in 45 games played. McClain was a member of Villanova's National Championship team in 1985.

McClain also played professionally in France, Canada, the Philippines, Indonesia and Greece before finishing his career in Australia.

McClain had a career in Australia in the National Basketball League (NBL) during the early 1990s. He started in Australia in 1991 with the Sydney Kings, staying with the team until the end of 1993. After three years away he returned to the NBL for a season with the Gold Coast Rollers in 1996, followed by his last season in Australia in 1997 with the Brisbane Bullets. McClain's record in Australia saw him just miss out on a place on the NBL's 25th Anniversary Team, being the third alternate in voting. He played 105 games in the NBL, averaging 25.4 points, 6.8 rebounds and 5 assists per game.

He was the most valuable player (MVP) of the 1989 Continental Basketball Association All-Star Game.

On October 10, 2013, McClain was named in the Sydney Kings 25th Anniversary Team.

References

External links
 at esake.gr

1963 births
Living people
African-American basketball players
American expatriate basketball people in Australia
American expatriate basketball people in France
American expatriate basketball people in Greece
American men's basketball players
Basketball players from Worcester, Massachusetts
Brisbane Bullets players
Gold Coast Rollers players
Indiana Pacers draft picks
Indiana Pacers players
La Crosse Catbirds players
Milon B.C. players
Quad City Thunder players
Rockford Lightning players
Small forwards
Sydney Kings players
Villanova Wildcats men's basketball players
American expatriate basketball people in the Philippines
Great Taste Coffee Makers players
Philippine Basketball Association imports
21st-century African-American people
20th-century African-American sportspeople